Douglas Muir may refer to:

 Douglas Muir (actor) (1904–1966), British actor
 Douglas N. Muir, British philatelist
 Douglas Muir (rugby union) (1925–2014), Scotland rugby union player